Ivica Majstorović (born 20 September 1981) is a German-Croatian retired footballer who played as a defensive midfielder, centre-back.

References

External links
 

1981 births
Living people
Footballers from Munich
Association football defenders
Association football midfielders
German footballers
Croatian footballers
SpVgg Unterhaching players
Panionios F.C. players
PAS Giannina F.C. players
A.O. Kerkyra players
AEL Kalloni F.C. players
SV Mattersburg players
2. Bundesliga players
Super League Greece players
Football League (Greece) players
Austrian Football Bundesliga players
2. Liga (Austria) players
German expatriate footballers
Expatriate footballers in Greece
German expatriate sportspeople in Greece
Expatriate footballers in Austria
German expatriate sportspeople in Austria